This is an alphabetical list of villages in Prakasam district, Andhra Pradesh, India.

A 

 Adusumalli
 Alakurapadu
 Allur
 Amudalapalle
 Annangi
 Anubroluvaripalem
 Ardhaveedu
 Atchampeta
 Ayyaparaju Palem

B 

 B. Cherlopalli
 Badevaripalem
 Ballikurava
 Basireddipalle
 Basireddy Palem
 Bestavaripeta
 Bestawaripeta
 Bhairavakona
 Buddapalli

C 

 Chalappalem
 Chandaluru
 Chandrasekharapuram
 Chekurapadu
 Cherlo Donakonda
 Cheruvu Kommu Palem, Darsi mandal
 Cheruvu Kommu Palem, Ongole mandal
 Chilakapadu
 Chimakurthy
 Chinaganjam
 Chinavenkannapalem
 Chinthagumpalli
 Chodavaram

D–E 

 Darsi
 Davaguduru
 Devarapalem
 Dhenuva Konda
 Diguvametta
 Doddavaram
 Dornala
 Dupadu
 East Choutapalem
 Edumudi
 Elurivari palem
 Ethamukkala

G–J 

 G.Kothapalli
 Gajjala Konda
 Gamgam Palli
 Ganapavaram
 Gowtavaram
 Gudluru
 Hanumanthunipadu
 Inkollu
 Irasalagundam
 Janakavaram Panguluru
 Juvvigunta

K 

 K. Rajupalem
 Kambaladinne
 Kammavaripalem
 Kandukur
 Karamchedu
 Karavadi
 Karedu
 Keerthivaripalem
 Kolalapudi
 Komarolu
 Komminenivaripalem
 Konakanamitla
 Kondamanjulur
 Kondamuru
 Kondapi
 Konidena
 Kopperapalem
 Koppole
 Korisapadu
 Koru Uppalapadu
 Kotha Palem
 Kotha Reddy Palem
 Kothapatnam
 Kovilampadu
 Kovur
 Kunamnenivaripalem
 Kunchepalli
 Kunkalamarru
 Kurichedu

L–M 

 Lingasamudram
 Maddipadu
 Malakonda
 Mallavaram
 Manduvavaripalem
 Manikeswaram
 Marripudi
 Martur
 Medarametla
 Meerjapeta
 Metlavaripalem
 Mottu Palle
 Mugachintala
 Mukthapuram
 Mundlamuru
 Muppalla
 Murugummi
 Mynampadu

N–O 

 Nagandla
 Nagulapalem
 Naguluppalapadu
 Nakkalapalem
 Nekunam Puram
 Nidamanur
 Obannapalem

P 

 P.Naidu Palem
 Padarthi
 Pajarla
 Pakala
 Palugunti palli
 Palukuru
 Pamidipadu
 Pamuru
 Parchur
 Peda Araveedu
 Peda Bommalapuram
 Pedacherlopalle
 Pernamitta
 Pokuru
 Ponduru
 Ponnaluru
 Pothukatla
 Pullalacheruvu
 Punugodu

R 

 Rachavaripalem
 Racherla
 Rajampalli
 Ramayapalem, Marripudi
 Ramayapalem, Peda Araveedu
 Ramayapatnam
 Ravinuthala
 Rayavaram
 Reddicherla
 Rudravaram

S 

 Sakhavaram
 Santhamaguluru
 Santhanuthalapadu
 Seelamvaripalli
 Singanna Palem
 Singarakonda
 Sudivari palem

T–U 

 T. Naidu Palem
 Takkellapadu
 Talamalla
 Tangutur
 Tarlupadu
 Tellapadu
 Thallur
 Themidithapadu
 Thimmasamudram
 Tripuranthakam
 Ulavapadu
 Uppugundur
 Uppumaguluru

V–Z 

 V. Kopperapadu
 V. R. Kota
 Vaggampalli
 Valaparla
 Vallur
 Veerannapalem
 Veligandla
 Vellalacheruvu
 Venkata Raju Palem
 Venkatachalam Palli
 Venkatapuram
 Vennuru
 Vinjanampadu
 Vinodarayunipalem
 Voletivaripalem
 Yeddanapudi
 Yendluru
 Yerragondapalem
 Yerrobana Palle
 Zarugumilli

Prakasam district